, born in Matsue, Shimane, was a Japanese woodblock printmaker. He was one of the prominent leaders of the sōsaku hanga ("creative print") movement in 20th century Japan. 

Hiratsuka's father was a shrine carpenter, and his grandfather was an architect who designed houses and temples. Therefore, the artist was introduced to wood-working and architecture early in his life.

Hiratsuka was the best–trained woodcarver in the sōsaku hanga movement. From 1928 onwards he taught the renowned sōsaku hanga artist Shikō Munakata (1903–1975) wood carving. The same year he joined with seven other like-minded artists to work on the 100 Views of New Tokyo series, to which he contributed twelve prints; his prints were lauded for their "technical beauty and perfection." Between 1935 and 1944 Hiratsuka taught the first blockprinting course at the Tokyo School of Fine Arts. 

He moved to Washington D.C. in 1962 and spent thirty three years in the United States. While living in Washington DC, he was commissioned by three standing Presidents to carve woodblock prints of National Landmarks, which included the Lincoln Memorial, Washington Monument and Library of Congress which are in the collections of The National Gallery and Freer Gallery today. He ultimately returned to Japan in 1994. 

In 1970 Hiratsuka became the first print artist to receive the Order of Cultural Merit, and in 1977 he was the first artist to be given the Order of the Sacred Treasure for "the quality of his art, the techniques he was able to pass along to his students and followers, and his accomplishments in promoting friendship between the United States and Japan." In 1991, the Hiratsuka Unichi Print Museum was opened in Suzaka, Nagano.

Many of his woodblock prints are of temples, bridges, in addition to landscapes he captured in his travels throughout Japan, Korea, and the United States. Hiratsuka was also a serious collector of old Buddhist prints, and his works are influenced by his exposure to Buddhist figures. He also had an extensive collection of roof tiles, Judaica and Bibles in every language, and when he was not practicing his art, spent hours reading. 

Hiratsuka's techniques and styles evolved over his lifetime. Pre-World War II he made many color woodblock prints and engravings, postwar he worked almost exclusively on black-and-white prints. He considered monochrome printing to be the "zenith of the art of picture printing", and was celebrated for his work in this medium.

His most famous technique is called tsukibori ("poking strokes"). With a small square-end chisel (aisuki), Hiratsuka rocked the blade side to side in short strokes, producing rough and jagged edges. His students include Kobashi Yasuhide.

Hiratsuka died in Tokyo at the age of 102.

References

 Merritt, H., et al. Hiratsuka: Modern Master. Chicago: Art Institute of Chicago, 2001.
 Michener, James A., The Modern Japanese Print: An Appreciation, Tuttle Publishing, Rutland, Vermont, 1968, pp. 15-18

External links
Unichi Hiratsuka, Sosaku-Hanga Master
Hiratsuka Un'ichi Hanga Museum in Suzaka, Nagano

1895 births
1997 deaths
Japanese centenarians
Japanese printmakers
Men centenarians
People from Shimane Prefecture
Sosaku hanga artists